Billy Guy Anderson (February 17, 1941 – April 11, 1996) was an American football quarterback who played professionally in the American Football League.

College career
Anderson played college football at the University of Tulsa. He established school and NCAA records as the starting quarterback in 1965. He led the nation in passing and total offense while setting school records for most passing yards in one game (502), most passing yards in a season (3,464), most completions for a game (42) and most passing attempts in one game (65). Completing 58 percent of his passes, he had 30 touchdown passes in 1965. He was an All-Missouri Valley Conference performer his senior season.

In the 1960s, Tulsa took the collegiate passing game to a level never seen before. The Hurricane averaged nearly 318 yards in 1964, and increased that average to 346 yards a year later. Anderson helped revolutionize the way college football was played.

Billy Anderson threw the first touchdown pass in Astrodome history - to Galena Park's Howard Twilley - when Tulsa defeated University of Houston 14-0 in 1965, the first football game ever played in the Dome. Anderson led the nation in passing that year.

In 1986, Anderson was inducted into the Tulsa Athletic Hall of Fame. His jersey, #14, was retired September 25, 1995.

Professional career
Anderson played professionally in the American Football League for the Houston Oilers in 1967 and was drafted by the Los Angeles Rams in 1965.

Death
He died on April 11, 1996 of amyotrophic lateral sclerosis (known popularly as Lou Gehrig's disease).

See also
 List of American Football League players
 List of NCAA major college football yearly passing leaders
 List of NCAA major college football yearly total offense leaders

References

1941 births
1996 deaths
Deaths from motor neuron disease
Neurological disease deaths in Texas
People from Ellis County, Texas
American football quarterbacks
Players of American football from Texas
Navarro Bulldogs football players
Tulsa Golden Hurricane football players
Houston Oilers players
American Football League players